Style is a 2016 Indian Malayalam-language action thriller film directed by Binu Sadanandan starring Unni Mukundan, Tovino Thomas, Priyanka Kandwal, Master Ilhan, Shine Tom Chacko and Balu Varghese in the leading roles. Mumbai-based model Priyanka Kandwal debuted as a heroine in the film. Jassie Gift wrote the songs and Rahul Raj composed the background score. The film, edited by National Award winner Vivek Harshan, was released on 2 January 2016. Despite receiving negative reviews, the film was a commercial success.

Premise
Tom, a young automobile mechanic, falls in love with Diya. After an accident, a powerful don named Edgar comes into their lives. A rivalry between Tom and Edgar leads to Edgar's humiliation.

Cast 
 Unni Mukundan as Tom  
 Tovino Thomas as Edgar Fletcher / Fletcher; Edgar's Father (dual role)
 Priyanka Kandwal as Diya
 Balu Varghese as DiCaprio aka Kapra
 Ilhan as Jerry
 Vijayaraghavan as Tom and Jerry's father
 Rony David as Stephan
 Baiju Santhosh as  Prakashan
 Manju Sathish as Tom and Jerry's mother
 Dominic
 Noby as Gymman
 Stunt Silva as Martyn
 Shine Tom Chacko as Alvy Benedict (cameo appearance)

Production 
The same team produced the movie Ithihasa. The film was announced in March 2015 and started its preliminary filming in July. Shooting occurred in two main sessions and was completed mid-November 2015. The film was released on 2 January 2016.

Music

The film has three songs composed by Jassie Gift. One of which, "Chenthamachundil," was particularly well received by audiences. The film also features a remixed version of a song from the 1977 movie Saritha, originally performed by K. J. Yesudas and remixed by Karthik. The background score of the film was composed, arranged and produced by Rahul Raj and released under the label Muzik247.

References

External links 

2016 films
Films shot in Kollam
2010s Malayalam-language films